Chak Korra Sadat is a location in Fatehpur district, Uttar Pradesh state, India.  Its PIN is 212622.

References

Villages in Fatehpur district